Peel v. Attorney Disciplinary Commission of Illinois, 496 US 91 (1990), was a decision of the Supreme Court of the United States that Illinois' rule against attorneys advertising themselves as "certified" violated their freedom of speech under the First Amendment. The Illinois Attorney Registration and Disciplinary Commission (IARDC) had found that Peel's letterhead, which stated that he was "Certified Civil Trial Specialist By the National Board of Trial Advocacy," had broken state professional rules, and the Illinois Supreme Court had adopted their recommendation of public sanction. The U.S. Supreme Court reversed, saying the letterhead was truthful, and the First Amendment favored disclosure over concealing information.

Background 
Gary E. Peel was admitted to the bar in Illinois in 1968, in Arizona in 1979, and in Missouri in 1981, and his law practice was located in Edwardsville, Illinois. In 1981 he earned a "Certificate in Civil Trial Advocacy" from the National Board of Trial Advocacy (NBTA), which was renewed in 1986. The requirements for this certificate included extensive trial experience, completion of relevant continuing legal education classes, and passing a day-long exam. In 1983, Peel starting including a mention of this certificate in his letterhead, along with the states where he was licensed to practice:

However, the Illinois Code of Professional Responsibility (in Rule 2-105(a)(3)) stated "A lawyer or law firm may specify or designate any area or field of law in which he or its partners concentrates or limits his or its practice. Except as set forth in Rule 2-105(a), no lawyer may hold himself out as 'certified' or a 'specialist.' " The IARDC filed a complaint in 1987.

Disciplinary proceedings

Arguments 
The U.S. Supreme Court (in Bates v. State Bar of Arizona in 1977) had already ruled that advertising by attorneys was commercial speech, and therefore was protected by the First Amendment as long as it was not misleading. The IARDC thus argued that Peel's letterhead was misleading, and could be banned, because 1) the public might think the certificate was officially recognized in some way by the state of Illinois, which it was not, 2) "certified" was a technical term that the public might misunderstand, and 3) it was a claim about the quality of the services he offered, which was inherently misleading.

Peel, on the other hand, argued that the letterhead was simply the truth, and was relevant to a client's choice about which lawyer to hire. Moreover, given how strong the First Amendment's protection of free speech was, even commercial speech, the state should have to do more to justify its prohibition.

Decision of the Illinois Supreme Court 
The Illinois Supreme Court ruled against Peel. To begin with, the Court felt it was important to protect the state's sole authority to license attorneys. Noting that the letter heading listed "Licensed: Illinois, Missouri, Arizona" immediately below the certification, the Court said it would easy for a member of the public (who might not know how the bar admission process worked) to not understand the difference. The Court also noted that the 1983 version of the Model Rules of Professional Conduct of the American Bar Association (ABA) contained a ban similar to Illinois' ban, and modifications to that model rule (Rule 7.4) in 1988 still left the ban on advertising of "certifications" intact. The official ABA comments to the modifications said,

As such, the Court said the current ban was justified. Peel appealed to the U.S. Supreme Court.

Decision of the U.S. Supreme Court 
In a 5–4 decision, the U.S. Supreme Court reversed, holding that Peel's letterhead was protected commercial speech. The Court was rather divided about this case; the plurality opinion only represented four justices (Stevens—its author—joined by Brennan, Blackmun, and Kennedy), and only became the opinion of the court because Marshall voted with them (but wrote a separate concurring opinion, which was also joined by Brennan). The dissent was also divided, with Justices White and O'Connor writing separately, and Rehnquist and Scalia joining O'Connor's opinion.

Plurality Opinion 
In an opinion written by Justice Stevens, the Court said that Illinois was wrong to focus on "implied claims" rather than the "facial accuracy" of Peel's claim of certification. While not every consumer would investigate the significance of the certification, or the trustworthiness of the NBTA, they certainly could do so if the wished:

The Court also rejected the idea that merely potential confusion or misinformation was enough to justify a ban. Because of the importance of protecting free speech, a rule that was "broader than reasonably necessary to prevent the perceived evil" was unconstitutional. States could certainly ban sham certifications, but the plurality could see no justification for banning certifications from bona fide organizations like the NBTA.

Marshall's Concurrence 
Marshall wrote separately to say that, although agreed Peel's letterhead was neither "actually" or "inherently" misleading—and therefore the ruling against Peel had to be overturned—nevertheless the current professional rule may be constitutional with slight modifications, because:

White's Dissent 
White agreed with Marshall's analysis that the letterhead was potentially misleading. He voted differently from Marshall, though, because "As I see it, it is the petitioner who should have to clean up his advertisement so as to eliminate its potential to mislead."

O'Connor's Dissent 
O'Connor, joined by Rehnquist and Scalia, argued that proper professional regulation of attorneys required more deference to states than the plurality had granted:

References 

United States Supreme Court cases
1990 in United States case law
1990 in Illinois
Legal history of Illinois
Legal ethics
Practice of law
Freedom of expression
Freedom of expression in the United States
First Amendment to the United States Constitution
Advertising
United States First Amendment case law
United States Free Speech Clause case law